Long Mỹ  may refer to several places in Vietnam, including:

Long Mỹ (town), a district-level town of Hậu Giang Province
Long Mỹ district, a rural district of Hậu Giang Province
Long Mỹ, Bà Rịa–Vũng Tàu, a commune of Đất Đỏ District
Long Mỹ, Bến Tre, a commune of Giồng Trôm District
Long Mỹ, Vĩnh Long, a commune of Mang Thít District